G. Venkateswaran (died 3 May 2003), popularly known as G.V., was an Indian film producer and chartered accountant. He was the elder brother of director and screenwriter Mani Ratnam and G. Srinivasan. Venkateswaran was the promoter of GV Films, one of the first movie companies in India to raise capital through the stock market and Sujatha Productions. As an actor, he played a cameo in Pagaivan and played himself in Prabhu starrer Raja Kaiya Vacha.

Early life 
G. Venkateswaran was the eldest son of S. Gopala Ratnam, who produced films for Venus Pictures. His younger brothers were Mani Ratnam and G. Srinivasan. Venkateswaran studied commerce at University of Madras, and became a chartered accountant. He remained one for nearly a decade before venturing into film distribution, and production.

Filmography 

Films produced after GV's death
Ullam Ketkume (2005)
Kaivantha Kalai (2006)
Urchagam (2007)
TN 07 AL 4777 (2009)

Death 
On 3 May 2003, Venkateswaran, aged 55, committed suicide by hanging at his residence. He was survived by his wife, Sujatha, and two children.

References

External links 

 

Tamil film producers
1948 births
2003 deaths
Film producers from Tamil Nadu
Businesspeople from Madurai
Artists who committed suicide
Suicides by hanging in India
2003 suicides